Dehiwala West Grama Niladhari Division is a Grama Niladhari Division of the Dehiwala Divisional Secretariat of Colombo District of Western Province, Sri Lanka. It has Grama Niladhari Division Code 540A.

Dehiwala West is a surrounded by the Dehiwala East, Jayathilaka, Wellawatta South and Galwala Grama Niladhari Divisions.

Demographics

Ethnicity 

The Dehiwala West Grama Niladhari Division has a Sri Lankan Tamil majority (54.8%), a significant Sinhalese population (21.8%) and a significant Moor population (20.2%). In comparison, the Dehiwala Divisional Secretariat (which contains the Dehiwala West Grama Niladhari Division) has a Sinhalese majority (60.5%), a significant Moor population (20.8%) and a significant Sri Lankan Tamil population (14.5%)

Religion 

The Dehiwala West Grama Niladhari Division has a Hindu plurality (44.4%), a significant Muslim population (22.5%), a significant Buddhist population (14.1%) and a significant Roman Catholic population (10.7%). In comparison, the Dehiwala Divisional Secretariat (which contains the Dehiwala West Grama Niladhari Division) has a Buddhist majority (54.3%), a significant Muslim population (22.6%) and a significant Hindu population (12.1%)

Colombo District
Grama Niladhari divisions of Sri Lanka

References